Charles George Milnes Gaskell PC (23 January 1842 – 9 January 1919) was an English lawyer and  Liberal Party politician.

Milnes Gaskell was born in London, the son of James Milnes Gaskell M.P., of Thornes House, Wakefield, Yorkshire, and Wenlock Abbey, Much Wenlock, Shropshire, and his wife Mary Williams-Wynn. He was educated at Eton College and Trinity College, Cambridge, where he graduated BA in 1863 and MA in 1866, and was called to the bar at Inner Temple in 1866. He was  a J.P. and Deputy Lieutenant for the West Riding of Yorkshire and was Chairman of the West Riding County Council from 1893 to 1910.
 
Milnes Gaskell stood  unsuccessfully in Pontefract in 1868 and at Knaresborough in 1881. At the 1885 general election he was elected as the first Member of Parliament for Morley and held it until he retired from parliament at the 1892 general election. He was awarded an Honorary LLD by the University of Leeds in 1904. and was made a Privy Counsellor in 1908.  From 1902 to 1914 he was Honorary Colonel of the 4th Battalion of the King's Own Yorkshire Light Infantry.

Milnes Gaskell, who lived at Thornes House, Wakefield, and at Wenlock Abbey, married Lady Catherine Henrietta Wallop, daughter of the 5th Earl of Portsmouth in 1876.  She was a minor author.

Milnes Gaskell had a long-standing friendship with the American Henry Adams who introduced him to novelist Henry James. He and his wife invited both men to stay frequently at Wenlock Abbey, where the couple entertained many artists, writers, politicians and intellectuals of the day including explorer Isabella Bishop, artist Robert Bateman and writers Edith Sichel and Thomas Hardy.

Milnes Gaskell died at Thornes House at the age of 76, and was buried in the parish churchyard at Much Wenlock.  In his will he left Thornes House to his son, Evelyn, and Wenlock Abbey to his wife, who died in 1935, leaving the Abbey to their daughter, Mrs. Mary Ward.

References

1842 births
1919 deaths
Alumni of Trinity College, Cambridge
Liberal Party (UK) MPs for English constituencies
Members of the Privy Council of the United Kingdom
UK MPs 1885–1886
UK MPs 1886–1892
People educated at Eton College
English barristers